Vilard is both a surname and a given name. Notable people with the name include:

Surname
Bernadette Vilard ( Moidele Bickel; 1937–2016), German costume designer
Eddy Vilard (born 1988), Mexican actor and model
Hervé Vilard (born 1946), French composer, singer, and stage performer

Given name
Vilard Normcharoen (1962–2014), Thai beach soccer player

See also
Vilar (surname), a similarly spelled surname
Vilardi (surname), a similarly spelled surname
Villard (surname), a similarly spelled surname